Shannon MacVean-Brown is an American prelate of the Episcopal Church who is the eleventh and current Bishop of Vermont, since 2019.

Biography
MacVean-Brown graduated with a Master of Divinity from Seabury-Western Theological Seminary in 2004 and has a Doctor of Ministry from Ecumenical Theological Seminary. She was ordained deacon in 2004 and priest in 2005 in the Diocese of Michigan.

Prior to her election, she was interim rector at St Thomas' Church in Franklin, Indiana. She was elected Bishop of Vermont on May 18, 2019 during a Special Electing Convention which took place in Burlington, Vermont. She was consecrated on September 28, 2019 at Ira Allen Chapel in Burlington by Presiding Bishop Michael Curry.

References 

Year of birth missing (living people)
Living people
Women Anglican bishops
African-American Episcopalians
Seabury-Western Theological Seminary alumni
Episcopal bishops of Vermont